Gesha Point (‘Nos Gesha’ \'nos 'ge-sha\) is the small point on the east coast of Clarence Island in the South Shetland Islands, Antarctica separating the glacier termini of Orcho Glacier to the north and Treskavets Glacier to the south.

The point is named after the settlement of Gesha in Northern Bulgaria.

Location
British mapping in 1972 and 2009.

Maps
British Antarctic Territory. Scale 1:200000 topographic map. DOS 610 Series, Sheet W 61 54. Directorate of Overseas Surveys, Tolworth, UK, 1972.
South Shetland Islands: Elephant, Clarence and Gibbs Islands. Scale 1:220000 topographic map. UK Antarctic Place-names Committee, 2009.
 Antarctic Digital Database (ADD). Scale 1:250000 topographic map of Antarctica. Scientific Committee on Antarctic Research (SCAR). Since 1993, regularly upgraded and updated.

References
 Bulgarian Antarctic Gazetteer. Antarctic Place-names Commission. (details in Bulgarian, basic data in English)
 Gesha Point. SCAR Composite Gazetteer of Antarctica.

External links
 Gesha Point. Copernix satellite image

Headlands of the South Shetland Islands
Bulgaria and the Antarctic